Gzowski (feminine: Gzowska; plural: Gzowscy) is a surname of Polish-language origin. Its Russian-language equivalent is Gzovsky.

The surname may refer to:

 Casimir Gzowski (1813–1898), Polish-Canadian engineer
 Kazimierz Gzowski (1901–1986), Polish cavalry officer
 Peter Gzowski (1934–2002), Polish-Canadian broadcaster

See also
 

Polish-language surnames